The McDonogh Day Boycott on 7 May 1954 was a protest by African American public school students, teachers, and principals in New Orleans.  It was one of the city's first organized civil rights protests.

McDonogh Day was, and remains to a very limited extent, a ritual in the New Orleans Public Schools.  In May of every year, delegations of students would be brought to Lafayette Square, in front of what was then City Hall, to participate in a ceremony paying homage to the late John McDonogh, a 19th-century philanthropist who had endowed many of the public schools in the city. (Later, this tradition continued at the new civic center in Duncan Plaza.)

In the 1950s, the school system was racially segregated.  On McDonogh Day, delegations from white schools would perform their ritual functions—place flowers at the McDonogh statue, sing, receive keys to the city from the mayor—and leave.  Delegations from black schools, meanwhile, had to wait for a separate ceremony afterward, often standing all the while in hot, muggy, or otherwise uncomfortable New Orleans weather.

As McDonogh Day approached, black teachers' associations voiced protest over the procedure.  Arthur Chapital, director of the local branch of the NAACP, called for a boycott.  He urged Revius Ortique, Jr, an African American labor leader, to make radio broadcasts asking parents to keep their children home on McDonogh Day.

The boycott was near-total.  Of 32,000 African American students in the system, only 34 attended, along with one school principal.  Mayor Chep Morrison was left holding surplus keys to the city.

The protest was repeated for another two years.

As for John McDonogh (died 1850), his will did leave money to the cities of New Orleans and Baltimore, Maryland, with the following stipulation, "...that the legacies to the two cities are for certain purposes of public utility, and especially for the establishment and support of free schools in said cities and their respective suburbs, (including the town of McDonogh, as a suburb of New Orleans,) wherein the poor, and the poor only, of both sexes, of all classes and castes of color, shall have admittance, free of expense, for the purpose of being instructed in the knowledge of the Lord, and in reading, writing, arithmetic, history, geography, and singing."

References

See also
The McDonogh Three

Education in New Orleans
20th century in New Orleans
1954 in Louisiana
1954 protests